Calliostoma biangulatum is an extinct species of sea snail, a marine gastropod mollusk, in the family Calliostomatidae within the superfamily Trochoidea, the top snails, turban snails and their allies.

Distribution
This species occurs in France.

References

biangulatum
Fossil taxa described in 2017